Beautiful Soul is the first studio album by German singer Mamadee, released on January 25, 2013. Eleven of the songs on the album were recorded in Miami, USA, the others in Jamaica and Germany. The album was created with the support of Born Free aka Conrad Glaze from Born Free Records.

Track listing

Notes

References

External links 
Review by Reggaeville

2013 debut albums
Mamadee albums